The 2010 Stony Brook Seawolves football team represented Stony Brook University as a member of the Big South Conference during the 2010 NCAA Division I FCS football season. The team was led by fifth-year head coach Chuck Priore and played it home games at Kenneth P. LaValle Stadium at Stony Brook, New York. The Seawolves compiled an overall record of 6–5 with a mark of 5–1 in conference place, sharing the Big South title with Liberty and Coastal Carolina. It was Stony Brook's second consecutive Big South title. Due to the three-way tie atop the conference standings, the Big South's automatic bid to the NCAA Division I Football Championship playoffs was given to Coastal Carolina, not Stony Brook, who allowed more points against the Big South opponents.

Before the season

Recruitment
In the off-season Hofstra University, Stony Brook’s Long Island rivals, announced that it would cut its football team for future season after 2009 leaving the Seawolves as the sole college football team in the long island area. As NCAA rules state, when a college team is cut, football athletes that transfer to another school don’t need to meet residency requirements to start play. This led to five incoming transfer from Hofstra to begin play at Stony Brook including Miguel Mayonet, and Brock Jackolski for the 2010 season.

Schedule

Roster

References

Stony Brook
Stony Brook Seawolves football seasons
Big South Conference football champion seasons
Stony Brook Seawolves football